The 1950 Canadian caribou famine happened when a change in caribou migration patterns caused widespread death in the southern interior of the Kivalliq Region in the west of Canada's Hudson Bay. The resulting famine wiped out half of the impacted Caribou Inuit communities.  

In the early 1950s the Canadian media reported the starvation deaths of 60 Caribou Inuit. The government was slow to act but in 1959 moved the surviving 60, of around the 120 that were alive in 1950, to settlements such as Baker Lake and Eskimo Point. This set off an Arctic settlement push by the Canadian government where those First Nations living in the North were encouraged to abandon their traditional way of life and settle in villages and outposts of the Canadian North. It was this time that a Richard Harrington took his iconic photo of a starving Inuit mother, pressing her nose and lips to those of her youngest child. On February 8, 1950 a few days before Harrington wrote in his journal:

See also
St. Lawrence Island famine

Bibliography
Notes

References
 
 - Total pages: 510 

Caribou
1950 in Canada
1950 disasters in Canada
20th-century famines